

Squad

Results

First Division

Football League Cup

FA Cup

Arsenal entered the FA Cup in the third round proper, in which they were drawn to face Sheffield United.

References

External links
 Arsenal 1977–78 on statto.com

Arsenal
Arsenal F.C. seasons